Alice's Adventures in Wonderland is a ballet in three acts by Christopher Wheeldon with a scenario by Nicholas Wright, based on Alice's Adventures in Wonderland by Lewis Carroll. It was commissioned by The Royal Ballet, Covent Garden, and the National Ballet of Canada, and had its world premiere on Monday, 28 February 2011. The music by Joby Talbot is the first full-length score (1 hour 40 minutes) for the Royal Ballet in 20 years. It is also the first full-length narrative ballet commissioned by The Royal Ballet since 1995.

Production
The work is based on Lewis Carroll's 1865 well-known children's book Alice's Adventures in Wonderland. Wheeldon was attracted by the physicality of the characters and the perfect central role for a ballerina: "The Royal Ballet already has a wealth of full-blooded ballets. I wanted to create something lighter and more friendly." He chose Lauren Cuthbertson for the lead role of Alice as someone who could "captivate the audience and make them believe in Alice." As for the music, Talbot explained that he "wanted to find a new sound, the right timbre for Wonderland." His orchestral score has a large percussion section and four female voices.

Karen Kain, the artistic director of National Ballet of Canada contacted the Royal Ballet and proposed a co-production after learning about the ballet. The company had the production's North American premiere in 2011, starring Jillian Vanstone.

By 2012, Wheeldon had changed the structure of the ballet so that it consisted of three acts instead of the original two and had inserted an additional pas de deux for Alice and the knave.

The ballet had since been performed by Royal Swedish Ballet in 2016, Royal Danish Ballet in the 2016-17 season, The Australian Ballet in 2017, and by the New National Theatre, Tokyo in June of 2022. Amongst others.

Instrumentation
Alice’s Adventures in Wonderland is scored for the following orchestra:

Woodwinds: Piccolo I and II, flute I, II and III, Oboe I and II, 
Oboe d’amore, Cor anglais, Clarinet I in B♭, II in B♭ and III in B♭,
Clarinet in E♭, Bass Clarinet in B♭, Bassoon I and II, Contrabassoon

Brass: 4 French Horns in F, Ram’s Horn, Piccolo Trumpet in B♭,
3 Trumpets in B♭, 2 tenors, Bass Trombone, Tuba

Percussion: Timpani, Xylophone, Marimba, Vibraphone, Crotales, Glockenspiel, Keyed Glockenspiel, Handbells, Tubular bells, Church Bell in G, 3 Tam-Tams, Bass Drum, Cymbal and Pedal Bass Drum set, Side Drum with Snare Drums, Kick Drum, 2 Tom Toms, Rototom, “Trash”: Pots, Pans etc, triangle, Zill, 2 China Cymbals, Sizzle Cymbal, Clashed Cymbals, 3 Suspended Cymbals ,Hi-hat, bell tree, mark tree, jingle bells, cowbell, clapper, 2 Tambourines, String Drum, Wind Machine, Thunder Sheet, Ratchet, Football Rattle, Castanets, Claves, 2 Woodblocks, 
3 Temple Blocks, Frog Guiro, shaker, Dumbek, Riq

2 Harps

Piano, Celesta

4 Female Singers

Strings: First Violins, Second Violins, Violas, Cellos and double basses.

Characters

Oxford Characters:

Alice: the original protagonist in Lewis Carroll's novel, in which she is a child; in the ballet she is a teenager beginning her first romance.
Henry Liddell and his wife: Alice's parents; her father is the vice-chancellor of Oxford.
Lewis Carroll: the author of Alice's Adventures in Wonderland
Lorina and Edith: Alice's two sisters.
Jack: the gardener's boy who is sent away after being falsely accused of stealing a jam tart. (In actuality, Alice gave it to him.)

Wonderland Characters

The Queen of Hearts: a homicidal monarch wearing blood red and terrorizing everyone in sight. Played by the same dancer who plays Alice's mother. 
The King of Hearts: Played by the same dancer who plays Alice's father. 
White Rabbit: the Queen's assistant, frightened of his employer. Portrayed by the same dancer who plays Lewis Carroll. 
Knave of Hearts: one of a pack of playing cards, he is accused of stealing jam tarts and stands trial. Played by the same dancer who plays Jack.
The Duchess: a lady of Wonderland who is invited to play croquet with the Queen.
The Frog: butler to the Duchess.
The Fish: letter-carrier of Wonderland.
The Cheshire Cat: a mysterious grinning cat whom Alice asks for directions.
Mad Hatter, March Hare & Dormouse: three characters whom Alice encounters having a tea party.
Caterpillar: an exotic insect who gives Alice a piece of hallucinogenic mushroom to eat.

Reviews of premiere
The premiere was well received by the audience although some reviewers commented on an excessively long first act. Wheeldon's choreography sometimes had to fight for attention, given all the special staging effects. Joby Talbot's exuberant score was credited with providing sophisticated, danceable music with vividly descriptive melodies. Lauren Cuthbertson's performance was said to be "alert, funny and deliciously un-twee". Writing in The Daily Telegraph, Sarah Crompton commented: "Wheeldon’s Alice will undoubtedly be hugely popular; it’s colourful, enjoyable fun. But it needed a little more dance and a little less action to take its place alongside those English story ballets the choreographer himself so admires.".

Casts

Videography
The 2011 production and 2017 Royal Ballet revival are filmed and released on DVD, both starred Lauren Cuthbertson as the title role.

In light of the impact of the COVID-19 coronavirus pandemic on the performing arts, Royal Danish Ballet released a recording of a performance online, which featured Holly Dorger as Alice.

References

External links
 

2011 ballet premieres
Ballets by Christopher Wheeldon
Ballets by Joby Talbot
Ballets created for The Royal Ballet
Works based on Alice in Wonderland
Cultural depictions of Alice Liddell
Cultural depictions of Lewis Carroll